For the Love of a Man is a 2015 Indian documentary film directed by Rinku Kalsy. The film explores the fan following of film actor Rajinikanth.

Synopsis
For the Love of a Man begins with coverage of fan activities during the releases of Rajinikanth's blockbuster films. It then proceeds to explain the historical and political context of fandom in Tamil Nadu through the stories of four fans: Kamal Anand, a mimicry artist, G. Mani, a gangster turned peanut-seller, and Murugan and Ravi, two sweetshop owners from Sholinghur.

Reception 
The film premiered at the 71st Venice International Film Festival. The Venice review expressed mixed feelings about the absence of Rajinikanth in the film. The Hollywood Reporter review likewise critiqued the film for the absence of the star from the film, but praised the film for providing a "jaw-dropping, intro to the extremes of actor-worship." The film was also shown at the Dubai International Film Festival and at the Mumbai International Film Festival, where it was cited as among the top documentaries of 2015.

References

External links
 
 

Rajinikanth
2010s Tamil-language films
Indian documentary films
Documentary films about fandom
Documentary films about the film industry
Documentary films about entertainers
2015 films
2015 documentary films
2010s English-language films